Sun wheel may refer to:

 Various Solar symbols, including:
 Sun cross
 Swastika
 Black Sun (symbol)
 Component of a planetary gearing system
 The Pixar Pal-A-Round (former name)
 Sun Wheel (Da Nang), a Ferris wheel in Da Nang, Vietnam

See also
 Sun cross